General elections were held in Aruba on 7 January 1989. The People's Electoral Movement (MEP) emerged as the largest party, winning ten of the 21 seats in the Estates. The MEP formed a three-party coalition government with the Aruban Democratic Party and the Aruban Patriotic Party, with Nelson Oduber becoming Prime Minister.

Results

References

Elections in Aruba
Aruba
1989 in Aruba
January 1989 events in North America
Election and referendum articles with incomplete results